Events from the year 1590 in France

Incumbents
 Monarch – Henry IV

Events
14 March – Battle of Ivry
May to September – Siege of Paris

Births

Full date missing
François Perrier, painter (died 1650)

Deaths

Full date missing
Guillaume de Salluste Du Bartas, poet (born 1544)
André Thévet, priest, explorer and cosmographer (born 1516)
Charles de Bourbon, cardinal (born 1523)
Germain Pilon, sculptor (born c.1525)
Jean Baptiste Androuet du Cerceau, architect (born 1544/47)
Ambroise Paré, barber surgeon (born c.1510)

See also

References

1590s in France